Maximilian Dallinger (born 25 September 1996) is a German sport shooter.

He participated at the 2018 ISSF World Shooting Championships, winning a medal.

References

External links

Living people
1996 births
German male sport shooters
ISSF rifle shooters
People from Erding (district)
Sportspeople from Upper Bavaria
European Games competitors for Germany
Shooters at the 2019 European Games
21st-century German people